Mir Azam (born 15 January 1978) is a Pakistani first-class cricketer who played for Abbottabad cricket team.

References

External links
 

1978 births
Living people
Pakistani cricketers
Abbottabad cricketers
People from Swabi District